Akhtar Moeed Shah Al-Abidi, popularly known as Shah Ji, was a ancient Islamic scholar The late, Shah Ji became known for his spiritual healing abilities through his understanding of ancient Islamic knowledge, numerology and alphabets. He was able to help many people around the world and his efforts were highlighted in many newspapers and local media outlets. His main objective in life was to spread knowledge from the Quran to a wider audience. He was known as a practitioner of the mystical Tareeqat-e-Ovaisia. He was known to be a tolerant individual, welcoming people from varying backgrounds and religions to join communal meals preceded by zikr. Shah Ji died in 2010 and the anniversary of his passing is commemorated each year with events similar to the gatherings Shah Ji previously hosted himself.

Early life 
Shah Ji [Akhtar Moeed Shah Al-Abidi] was born and raised in India, however, following the partition of the subcontinent, he migrated to Pakistan. He had lived in England since the early 1960s. He first arrived in Manchester, then later moved to Slough and returned to Manchester in his later years. Shah Ji frequently visited Pakistan and had two sons that migrated between the UK and Pakistan. He travelled widely in the Middle East, Africa and Europe and his efforts have been discussed in the media, relevant to faith healing (Tabeeb-e-Islami), original Islamic writings, and propagation of compassion and humanity in the world.

Published works 
Published literature by Akhtar Moeed Shah Al-Abidi include:

 Seerat-e-Mohammed, Mohammed-e-Arabee (Urdu and English, 2005)

References 

Year of birth missing
2010 deaths